Paavam Poornima is a 1984 Indian Malayalam-language drama film written and directed by Balu Kiriyath and produced by Erali. The film stars Mohanlal, Menaka, Mammootty and Sukumari. The film has songs composed by Raghu Kumar and background score by Johnson.

Poornima is a popular woman who has many suitors. However, when she is found dead in a place she had visited the night before, Jayaraj, her admirer, gets arrested for the crime.

Cast
Mohanlal
Menaka as Poornima
Mammootty as Jayaraj 
Bhagyasri 
Sukumari
Innocent
Adoor Bhasi
Sankaradi
Chithra
Kothuku Nanappan
Kunchan

Soundtrack
The music was composed by Raghu Kumar with lyrics by Balu Kiriyath.

References

External links
 

1984 films
1980s Malayalam-language films
Films scored by Raghu Kumar